Tyndale Christian School is an independent non-denominational Christian co-educational early learning, primary and secondary day school, located in Blacktown, a suburb in western Sydney, New South Wales, Australia.

The school is named after William Tyndale, a 16th-century religious reformer and scholar who translated the Bible into the Early Modern English and was tried for heresy and treason and then strangled and burnt at the stake. The school has students from 38 different ethnic backgrounds covering 58 different language groups. , the School had around 1,000 students from early learning, through Year K to Year 12.

History and Governance
Tyndale's story began in 1957 when the Blacktown Reformed Church looked into the feasibility of starting a Parent Controlled Christian School in Blacktown. The Association for Christian Education of Blacktown Ltd (Association). Was formed in 1958. In February 1966 the Kildare Rd site was officially opened with 3 classrooms, 2 teachers and 32 students. At the time this site was educating students from Kindergarten to Year 6. In 1976 Tyndale expanded to offering high school education. It then developed and moved to the current Douglas Road site in 1979. In 1981 the first cohort of Year 12 students completed the NSW Higher School Certificate (NSW HSC). The early learning centre commenced with a prep class in Term 2, 2008. The 2021 Year 12 cohort was the first to contain students who completed the whole of prep to Year 12 at Tyndale.

Tyndale continues to operate as an independent school. Membership of the governing body (the Association) is open to any Christian committed to providing Christ-centred education who subscribes to the school's Educational Creed. The Association elects directors who are responsible for Tyndale's overall vision, direction, governance, and policies.

Mission 
The mission of Tyndale Christian School is stated as the below:

Vision 
The vision statement of Tyndale Christian School is stated as the below:

Structure 
The school is split into three educational areas: early learning centre (pre-school and prep), primary school, and secondary school.

Early Learning Centre 
There are three preschool classes catering for children from three years of age and one prep class operating 5 days per week.

Primary 
The Primary school consists of Kindergarten to Year 6 (K-6). There are four Kindergarten classes and three in each subsequent year group. Each class has children of similar age with the one class teacher.

Sports, excursions, cultural or interest events, camps, concerts and other community celebrations are important and exciting aspects of the K-6 program. Primary offers a Christ-centred education and develops a firm basis upon secondary school education can be built.

Secondary 
The Secondary school consists of Year 7 to Year 12, which is then split into 2 areas: High (Year 7 and 8) and Senior (Year 9 to 12) working towards award of the NSW HSC.

Students in Years 11 and 12 are not expected to participate in compulsory Sport, although Year 11 students are able to play inter-school Sport activities.

Services 
Services available to students and families include:
 Before and after school care for Primary school children (K-6) including:
Before school care (from 6:30am)
After school care (to 6:30pm)
Vacation care (6:30am to 6:30 pm)
 Uniform shop
 Cafe - open to senior students, parents, visitors, and staff
 Lunch Online - providing pre-ordered food to students at recess and lunch
 Morning and afternoon private buses - servicing the Blacktown local government area and selected surrounding suburbs

Facilities 
Since moving to the current site in the late 1970's, Tyndale has continued to invest in facilities to support the educational needs of students. This has included: 
 1981 - Technics, music and economics rooms
 1983 - First library
 1988 - New primary classrooms allowing double stream classes
 1995 - Multi-purpose school hall
 2004 - Technical and applied science block
 2011 - New library and multi-purpose centre plus a restaurant-quality hospitality trade training centre
 2015 - Administration building including dedicated Sick Bay
 2017 - Two-story secondary school building including independent learning centre and new drama classrooms and additional stage areas
 2018 - Prep facilities expanded to cater for children from 3 years of age
 2021 - Kindergarten  building including classrooms, common area, withdrawal space, playground and covered outdoor learning area

Tyndale's facilities are open to community use and this regularly involves local sporting and church groups. Tyndale's facilities have also been a designated polling place for both NSW and Australian elections.

Notable alumni 
 Graham Joseph Hill – theologian

See also

 List of non-government schools in New South Wales

References

External links 
 

1966 establishments in Australia
Educational institutions established in 1966
Private secondary schools in Sydney
Nondenominational Christian schools in Sydney
Private primary schools in Sydney
Blacktown